Simratpal "Simmer" Singh is a practicing Sikh United States Army officer and combat veteran. He won a federal lawsuit, Singh v. Carter, against the U.S. Department of Defense to be allowed to wear a religious beard and turban in uniform.

He graduated from West Point in 2010 and chose, while he was there, to shave in order to follow their rules and attend West Point. He completed Army Ranger School and a tour in Afghanistan, earning a Bronze Star medal. In 2016 he won a court case against the U.S. Department of Defense and gained permission to wear a religious beard and turban in uniform. Capt. Singh asked the Army in October 2015 to allow him to wear his beard and turban. They granted him temporary accommodation in December 2015. When the accommodation was about to expire in February 2016, the Army told Captain Singh to report for a series of tests. Singh sued on the grounds that other soldiers were not required to do similar activities and that the test was religious discrimination. In 2016 he won a permanent accommodation, making him the first active duty Sikh soldier to be approved to dress with his religious beliefs while in active duty.

In January 2017, the Army issued new regulations stating that all Sikh soldiers can wear their religious articles while serving.

Singh is currently in a staff position at Fort Belvoir, Virginia.

Singh's great grandfather served in World War I for the British Indian Army.

References 

United States Military Academy alumni
Living people
Year of birth missing (living people)
American Sikhs